Das Glockenspiel (English: Carillon or chime of bells) is the first single from the 1999 Schiller debut album, Zeitgeist. It's the debut of Schiller and it was subtitled internationally with the title The Bell. The trance music single was officially released on 31 December 1998 in Germany and was peaking at number 21 on German Singles Chart in 1999 and on number 17 in the UK Singles Chart. The cover art work shows a graphic of a bell. The music video was shot in the United States.

The single became famous for featuring a bell-like melody. The song's name is inspired by the poem "Das Lied von der Glocke" (Song of the Bell) by Friedrich Schiller from 1799. Christopher von Deylen, one of the producers of Schiller, had just read "Die Glocke" by Friedrich Schiller before the song was released. The band's name was also inspired by Friedrich Schiller.

Track listing

Maxi single

Vinyl

Credits and personnel 

 Written and produced by Christopher von Deylen and Mirko von Schlieffen
 Recorded and mixed at the Homebase Studio in Hamburg
 Artwork by Katja Stier
 Artwork in Scandinavia by TommyBoy @ Netpointers

Music video 

The official music video for "Das Glockenspiel" was shot in the USA by German director Marcus Sternberg. It has a length of 3:11 minutes. The video features a few dancers, four older Asian persons, who are playing a Mahjong game, and a woman in a traditional Asian festival costume. It shows also a ringing bell. The music video was shot in Chinatown in Los Angeles, California. The video was aired and became one of the most played music videos on German music television channel VIVA in 1999.

Charts 

References

External links
 
 The music video of Das Glockenspiel
 
 The single on Discogs

Schiller (band) songs
1998 singles
Songs written by Christopher von Deylen
1998 songs